The Daniela class is a series of eight container ships operated by Mediterranean Shipping Company and built by Samsung Heavy Industries in South Korea. The ships have a maximum theoretical capacity of 13,798 twenty-foot equivalent units (TEU).

2017 MSC Daniela fire 
On 4 April 2017 a fire broke out in one of the containers onboard of  while the ship was on route from Singapore to the Suez Canal. After the fire was put out the remaining containers were offloaded in the port of Colombo.  On 22 May she arrived in Shanghai for repairs. The repairs were initially expected to only take around three weeks. Eventually it would be almost eleven weeks before she could enter into service again, four months after the initial fire broke out.

List of ships

References 

Container ship classes
Ships built by Samsung Heavy Industries